Kaj Birket-Smith (20 January 1893 – 28 October 1977) was a Danish philologist and anthropologist. He specialized in studying the habits and language of the Inuit and Eyak. He was a member of Knud Rasmussen's 1921 Thule expedition. In 1940, he became director of the Ethnographic Department of the National Museum of Denmark.

Personal life

Kaj Birket-Smith was the son of Danish librarian and literary historian Sophus Birket-Smith and wife, Ludovica (born Nielsen). He received his Ph.D. in linguistics at the University of Pennsylvania in 1937. He was a Knight of the Order of the Dannebrog.

In 1920, Kaj and Minna Birket-Smith wed. Kaj Birket-Smith died in 1977, aged 84.

Awards
 1933 Hans Egede Medal by the Royal Danish Geographical Society.
 1938 Loubat Prize of the Royal Swedish Academy
 1952 Huxley Memorial Medal by the Royal Anthropological Institute of Great Britain and Ireland

Partial works
 (1916). The Greenland bow. København: Bianco Lunos bogtr.
 (1918). A geographic study of the early history of the Algonquian Indians
 (1920). Ancient artefacts from the Eastern United States
 (1924). Ethnography of the Egedesminde District with Aspects of the General Culture of West Greenland
 (1925). Preliminary report of the Fifth Thule Expedition Physical anthropology, linguistics, and material culture
 (1928). On the origin of Eskimo culture
 (1928). Five hundred Eskimo words: A comparative vocabulary from Greenland and Central Eskimo dialects
 (1928). The Greenlanders of the present day
 (1928). Physiography of West Greenland
 (1929). The Caribou Eskimos. Material and social life and their cultural position
 (1929). Drinking-tube and tobacco pipe in North America
 (1930). Contributions to Chipewyan ethnology
 (1933). Geographical notes on the Barren
 (1938). The Eyak Indians of the Copper River Delta, Alaska
 (1940). Anthropological observations of the Central Eskimos
 (1943). The origin of maize cultivation

References

1893 births
1977 deaths
20th-century Danish philologists
Danish ethnologists
Knights of the Order of the Dannebrog
20th-century philologists
Danish expatriates in the United States
University of Pennsylvania alumni